John of London, mathematician, was described by Roger Bacon as one of two "perfect" mathematicians, together with Pierre de Maricourt. Bacon probably knew John in Paris in the 1260s.

No works are certainly attributed to him, but he may be the author of an influential table of stellar coordinates. He may also be the 'Master John of London' who designed a form of astrolabe and was described by Roger of Lincoln as astronomus famosus (‘renowned astronomer’).

Notes

13th-century English people
13th-century English mathematicians
Year of birth unknown
Year of death unknown